You Decide may refer to:

"You Decide" (Fireflight song), song by Christian rock band Fireflight from their 2006 album The Healing of Harms
"You Decide" (Usher song), song by Usher from his joint album with Zaytoven titled A

See also
Eurovision: You Decide, former UK national selection for the Eurovision Song Contest (2016–19)
Festive Five: You Decide, a special event in December 2009 on Disney Channel (UK and Ireland), where kids who watch the channel could vote for their No. 1 programme
Decide (disambiguation)